"Christmas Without You" is a song by American singer Ava Max, released on October 15, 2020, through Atlantic Records. It was written by Max, Jesse Aicher, Sam Martin, and producers Gian Stone and Cirkut. A Christmas pop song, it contains a piano, jingle bell and bassline, alongside Max's melisma and whistle register vocals. "Christmas Without You" received generally favorable reviews from music critics, who praised the Christmas sound. The song peaked at number 28 on both the US Adult Contemporary chart and in Germany. A music video was released in 2022, which depicts Max in front of a winter-themed background.

Composition
Musically, "Christmas Without You" is a Christmas pop song, which is bouncy, upbeat, and has a retro influence. The song begins with piano chords, which transitions into the first chorus with jingle bell sounds. During the next verse, a bassline is used with a basic beat and harmony, before leading to the second chorus. Max uses melisma throughout the vocal-driven ballad, which climaxes with a whistle register in the last chorus. Jerrett Franklin of Nashville Music Reviews stated that Max's vocals become stronger in the song, comparing her whistle register to Mariah Carey.

Critical reception
Writing for Idolator, Mike Wass described "Christmas Without You" as a "feel-good festive anthem" with a "loved-up chorus", declaring the song as one of the best modern Christmas anthems. David Gleisner of Washington City Paper praised Max's vocals and songwriting, stating that the song evokes a positive emotion during Christmas.

Promotion
The music video for "Christmas Without You" was released on December 17, 2022. Max sports symmetrical, long, blonde hair and a Christmas-styled red dress, while appearing in front of a winter-themed background.

Taiwanese singer and Twice member Tzuyu performed a cover version of "Christmas Without You" in a studio on December 21, 2022, while wearing a white sweater, red scarf, and reindeer headband.

Personnel
Credits adapted from Tidal.

 Amanda Ava Kocivocals, songwriting
 Henry Walterproduction, engineering, songwriting, instruments, keyboards, programmer
 Gian Stoneproduction, bass, engineering, instruments, keyboards, programmer, songwriting
 Jesse Aichersongwriting
 Sam Martinsongwriting
 Rafael Fadulengineering
 Mark Schicguitar
 Kurt Thumkeyboard
 Chris Gehringermastering
 Serban Gheneamixing
 John Hanesmixing, engineering
 Yasmeen "YAS" Al-Mazeedistrings

Charts

Release history

References

2020 singles
Ava Max songs
2020 songs
Atlantic Records singles
Song recordings produced by Cirkut (record producer)
Songs written by Ava Max
American Christmas songs
Songs written by Sam Martin (singer)
Songs written by Cirkut (record producer)